Marcuzzi is an Italian surname. Notable people with the surname include:

Alessia Marcuzzi (born 1972), Italian television personality and actress
Angelo Marcuzzi (died 1453), Roman Catholic prelate, Bishop of Telese
Michael Marcuzzi, American visual effects artist
Santé Marcuzzi (born 1934), French rower
Sebastiano Marcuzzi (1725-1790) Italian abbot from Friuli and writer of texts on religion

Italian-language surnames